McMillan's catshark (Parmaturus macmillani) is a catshark of the family Scyliorhinidae, in the order Carcharhiniformes. McMillan's catshark is a small, rare, and little-known deepwater shark that is endemic to New Zealand. It is found at depths of 985–1350m on the lower continental slope around New Zealand, on the West Norfolk Ridge, and off North Cape. It can grow to a length of 45 cm.

Conservation status 
In 2017, the International Union for Conservation of Nature assesses this species as Data Deficient. In June 2018, the New Zealand Department of Conservation classified McMillan's catshark as "Data Deficient" with the qualifier "Uncertain whether Secure Overseas" under the New Zealand Threat Classification System.

References 

McMillan's catshark
Endemic marine fish of New Zealand
Taxa named by Graham Stuart Hardy
McMillan's catshark